Jorik Hendrickx (born 18 May 1992) is a Belgian former competitive figure skater. He is the 2017 CS Nebelhorn Trophy champion, the 2016 CS Nebelhorn Trophy silver medalist, a three-time Coupe du Printemps champion (2012, 2013, 2016), the 2017 International Challenge Cup champion, and a three-time Belgian national champion (2010, 2016, 2017). He qualified to the final segment at five World Championships and two Winter Olympics, finishing 16th in 2014 and 14th in 2018. He placed in the top ten at five European Championships.

Personal life 
Jorik Hendrickx was born in Turnhout, Belgium. He studied sport marketing and management at Johan Cruyff University in Tilburg. In early 2017, he began an internship at Speedo, working on a research project. At All Sport Benelux, his research focuses on the growth of Belgian e-commerce. His younger sister, Loena, is also a figure skater.

On February 1, 2018, Hendrickx publicly came out as gay.

Career 
Hendrickx began training at age five and a half. Since the age of 10, he is coached by Carine Herrygers. He began competing on the junior level internationally in 2007. He was out for four months in 2008 as a result of a groin injury. He debuted on the ISU Junior Grand Prix series in autumn 2009.

Hendrickx finished 9th at the 2012 European Championships. The next season, he received his first senior Grand Prix assignment, the 2012 Trophee Eric Bompard in November. Hendrickx placed 4th in the short program, but had to withdraw the next day after sustaining an injury in an off-ice warmup for the morning practice. He fractured his ankle, tearing ligaments from his fibula. Returning to the ice in January 2013, Hendrickx began practicing some jumps toward the end of the month. He missed the 2013 European Championships but competed at the 2013 World Championships, finishing 19th and qualifying a men's entry for Belgium at the 2014 Winter Olympics. He finished 16th.

After Turnhout's ice rink closed, Hendrickx decided to train at a temporary rink. He said, "It's extremely cold and the quality of the ice is not what it should be. The most important thing is that I didn't have to change environment, my school, coaches, medical team." He finished 4th at the 2017 European Championships in Ostrava, Czech Republic. It was the best result by a Belgian skater since 2009.

Hendricks won the 2017 Nebelhorn Trophy, and obtained an men's singles entry for Belgium at the 2018 Winter Olympics at Pyeongchang, South Korea. He participated in the figure skating event at the Olympics with his sister Loena, who also represented Belgium at the ladies' singles. After the Olympics, he skipped the 2018–19 figure skating season, and announced his retirement on 8 August 2019.

Coaching career 
Hendrickx now coaches figure skating. Among his students are Loena Hendrickx, his sister, and Lindsay van Zundert, the Dutch national champion in 2021. His sister, Loena, ranked 8th place at 2022 Beijing Olympics, and took the silver medal at 2022 World Figure Skating Champions in Montpellier, France. Loena is the first Belgian skater to place on the podium at World Championships in the ladies event.

Programs

Results 
GP: Grand Prix; CS: Challenger Series; JGP: Junior Grand Prix

Detailed results
Small medals for short program and free skating awarded only at ISU Championships.

References

External links 

1992 births
Living people
Belgian male single skaters
Sportspeople from Turnhout
Figure skaters at the 2014 Winter Olympics
Figure skaters at the 2018 Winter Olympics
Olympic figure skaters of Belgium
Gay sportsmen
Belgian gay men
Belgium LGBT sportspeople
LGBT figure skaters